Fungulus is a genus of marine tunicates.

Species
 Fungulus antarcticus Herdman, 1912
 Fungulus cinereus Herdman, 1882
 Fungulus curlus Monniot & Monniot, 1976
 Fungulus minutulus Monniot & Monniot, 1991
 Fungulus perlucidus (Herdman, 1881)

References

Stolidobranchia
Tunicate genera